John E. "Cactus Jack" Sterrett (1901 – 1984) was an American football and basketball coach.  He served as the head football coach at Bemidji State University from 1931 to 1934 and at the University of St. Thomas in St. Paul, Minnesota from 1935 to 1936, compiling a career college football coaching record of 16–26–4. Sterrett was also a head basketball coach at a number of different schools, including Bemidji State, Saint Louis University, and Wichita State University.

Head coaching record

College football

College basketball

References

External links
 

1901 births
1984 deaths
American men's basketball coaches
Bemidji State Beavers football coaches
Bemidji State Beavers men's basketball coaches
College men's basketball head coaches in the United States
High school football coaches in Minnesota
Iowa Hawkeyes men's basketball coaches
Saint Louis Billikens men's basketball coaches
St. Thomas (Minnesota) Tommies football coaches
St. Thomas (Minnesota) Tommies men's basketball coaches
Tulsa Golden Hurricane football coaches
Tulsa Golden Hurricane men's basketball coaches
Wichita State Shockers men's basketball coaches